Panagiotis Epitropopoulos (born 28 May 1938) is a Greek athlete. He competed in the men's decathlon at the 1960 Summer Olympics.

References

1938 births
Living people
Athletes (track and field) at the 1960 Summer Olympics
Greek decathletes
Olympic athletes of Greece
Athletes from Piraeus